Kurtis Byrne (born 9 April 1990) is an Irish professional footballer who plays for Bluebell United. He is the son of former Celtic and Southend United player Paul Byrne.

Career

Hibernian
Byrne was a member of the Hibernian under-19 side that won the league and cup double in the 2008–09 season. He scored the winning goal in both the decisive league match and the Youth Cup Final. Byrne was one of seven players in that side who were given professional contracts by Hibs following their success.

Byrne made his professional debut on 26 August 2009 in the Scottish League Cup against Brechin City, and made his league debut the following Sunday against Celtic.

Stirling Albion (loan)
Byrne was loaned to Stirling Albion for a month in February 2010.

East Fife (loan)
Byrne was then loaned to East Fife for the first half of the 2010–11 season. Byrne scored a hat-trick for East Fife in his fourth appearance for the club, a 6–0 win against Dumbarton.

After Hibs suffered from a striker shortage due to the sale of Anthony Stokes and an injury to Darryl Duffy, manager John Hughes commented that Byrne was not yet ready to play regularly in the SPL, and needed to "learn his trade" in lower division football.

Alloa Athletic (loan)
Byrne was loaned to Alloa Athletic on 31 March 2011 for the rest of the 2010–11 season. Hibs announced in late April that Byrne would be released at the end of the season.

Ross County
Byrne then signed for Ross County on a one-year contract. He helped the club win the 2011–12 Scottish First Division and promotion to the SPL.

Brechin City (loan)
Byrne was loaned to Brechin City in September 2012, and was then released by Ross County in December 2012.

Dundalk
Byrne signed for Dundalk in January 2013.

Bohemians
Byrne signed for Bohemians in November 2015, the club his father spent most of his career at.

St Patrick's Athletic
He signed for another of his father's old clubs, St Patrick's Athletic on 9 January 2017.

Linfield
He then signed for NIFL Premiership side Linfield.

The New Saints
In June 2018 he joined The New Saints of the Welsh Premier League citing a desire to return to full-time football.

Waterford
Following the conclusion of the 2019-20 Welsh Premier League, Kurtis returned to the League of Ireland and signed with Premier Division club Waterford.

Retirement
After a season at Athlone Town in 2021 and Bray Wanderers in 2022, Byrne announced his retirement from professional football in September 2022.

Honours
Stirling Albion
 Scottish League One (1): 2009–10

Ross County
 Scottish Championship (1): 2011–12

Dundalk
 League of Ireland (2): 2014, 2015
 FAI Cup (1): 2015
 League Cup (1): 2014
 President's Cup (1): 2015
 Leinster Senior Cup (1): 2015

Bohemians
 Leinster Senior Cup (1): 2016

The New Saints
 Welsh Premier League (1): 2018-19
 Welsh Cup (1): 2018-19

Career statistics

References

External links

Ex-Canaries profile

1990 births
Living people
Association footballers from Dublin (city)
Association football forwards
Republic of Ireland association footballers
Norwich City F.C. players
Hibernian F.C. players
Stirling Albion F.C. players
East Fife F.C. players
Scottish Premier League players
Scottish Football League players
Republic of Ireland expatriate association footballers
Expatriate footballers in England
Expatriate footballers in Scotland
Alloa Athletic F.C. players
Ross County F.C. players
Brechin City F.C. players
Dundalk F.C. players
Bohemian F.C. players
St Patrick's Athletic F.C. players
League of Ireland players
The New Saints F.C. players
Republic of Ireland youth international footballers
Waterford F.C. players
Athlone Town A.F.C. players
Bray Wanderers F.C. players